Women's doubles at the 2006 Asian Games was won by Yan Zi and Zheng Jie of the People's Republic of China.

Schedule
All times are Arabia Standard Time (UTC+03:00)

Results

Final

Top half

Bottom half

References
Women's doubles draw

Tennis at the 2006 Asian Games